Brunallergene Junior Etou (born 1 June 1994) is a Congolese professional footballer who plays as a midfielder for Pittsburgh Riverhounds.

Club career
On 22 June 2018, Etou joined Béziers in the Ligue 2 after beginning his career in the amateur divisions of France. Etou made his professional debut with Béziers in a 1–1 (6–5) shootout loss in the Coupe de la Ligue to US Orléans on 14 August 2018.

Etou joined USL Championship side Charlotte Independence on 23 January 2020.

Following Charlotte's self-relegation to USL League One, Etou signed with the Tampa Bay Rowdies on 11 January 2022. He was released by Tampa following their 2022 season.

On 28 February 2023, Etou joined fellow USL Championship side Pittsburgh Riverhounds on a year-long deal with an option for an additional year.

References

External links
 
 
 

1994 births
Living people
Sportspeople from Brazzaville
Association football midfielders
Republic of the Congo footballers
AS Béziers (2007) players
Le Havre AC players
Charlotte Independence players
Tampa Bay Rowdies players
Pittsburgh Riverhounds SC players
Ligue 2 players
Championnat National 2 players
USL Championship players
Republic of the Congo expatriate footballers
Republic of the Congo expatriate sportspeople in France
Expatriate footballers in France
Republic of the Congo expatriate sportspeople in the United States
Expatriate soccer players in the United States